This is a list of the Solar System's recent planetary conjunctions (in other words, when two planets look close together) for the period 2005–2020.

In astronomy, a conjunction is an event, defined only when using either an equatorial or an ecliptic celestial coordinate system, in which any two astronomical objects (e.g. asteroids, moons, planets, stars) have the same celestial longitude, normally as when observed from the Earth (geocentric).

In the case of a geocentric conjunction of two of the Solar System's planets, since these planets appear to travel "along the same line" (the ecliptic), the two planets appear on Earth as being near one another in the sky around the time of the conjunction.

The conjunctions are listed according to the equatorial coordinate system (in which the celestial longitude is termed right ascension).

2005

2006

2007

2008

2009

2010

2011

2012

2013

2014

2015

2016

2017

2018

2019

2020

References

Astrometry
Astrological aspects

Con